Raul Gustavo Pereira Bicalho (born 20 April 1999), known as Raul Gustavo, is a Brazilian professional footballer who plays as a centre back for Bahia, on loan from Corinthians.

Club career
Raul started his career in the youth squads of Democrata-SL and Betinense, before moving to the professional squad of Croatian club NK Lokomotiva in 2018. He moved over to Corinthians' Under-20s in 2019 and also took part of some Under 23s games.

He was loaned in early 2020 to Inter de Limeira as part of their 2020 Campeonato Paulista participation. Raul returned to the Corinthians after that loan and made his professional debut for the club in a 2020 Campeonato Brasileiro Série A away match against Bahia on 28 January 2021.

His first goal for Corinthians took place on 25 April 2021 in an away win against Santos at the 2021 Campeonato Paulista.

Career statistics

References

1999 births
Living people
Brazilian footballers
Sportspeople from Minas Gerais
Association football defenders
Campeonato Brasileiro Série A players
Sport Club Corinthians Paulista players
Associação Atlética Internacional (Limeira) players
NK Lokomotiva Zagreb players
Esporte Clube Bahia players
Brazilian expatriate footballers
Brazilian expatriate sportspeople in Croatia
Expatriate footballers in Croatia